Idioglossa bigemma is a species of moth of the family Batrachedridae. It is known from Mauritius, Réunion and South Africa.

The wingspan is about 10 mm. The head and face of this species are shining silvery, palpi and antennae silvery. The forewings are ochreous, shining with silvery and brassy metallic scales.

References

Moths described in 1881
Batrachedridae
Moths of Africa